Matt's Bar is a restaurant in south Minneapolis, Minnesota.  It is known as one of two businesses that created the Jucy Lucy.

History
The bar was originally named Nibs prior to 1954 and was owned by Nibs Martin, who later purchased the Magic Bar and renamed it Mr. Nibs. Matt Bristol worked at Nibs. It was reopened with the name Matt's Bar in 1954.  In 1998 Scott Nelson purchased the bar from the original owner Matt Bristol.

In a 1998 City Pages article, Cheryl Bristol, the daughter of bar founder and namesake Matt Bristol, told of how one day in 1954, a customer asked a cook to put two hamburger patties together and seal up some cheese in the middle. When the customer bit into the sandwich, he was heard to exclaim, "That's one juicy Lucy!"

It was depicted in an iconic painting by Michael Birawer

On June 26, 2014, the bar's original owner, Matt Bristol, died hours before the bar he founded was visited by President Barack Obama.

See also 
 List of hamburgers
 Jucy Lucy
 5-8 Club

References 

Buildings and structures in Minneapolis
Drinking establishments in Minnesota
Restaurants in Minnesota
Restaurants established in 1954
1954 establishments in Minnesota